"Allons à Lafayette" is the B-side of a 78rpm single recorded by Joe Falcon and Cléoma Breaux in 1928. The song is based on an older traditional tune called "Jeunes gens campagnard".  While there is some mystery on the reason Okeh Records didn't release Dr. James F. Roach's songs in 1925, "Allons à Lafayette" is officially known as the first commercial Cajun song to be recorded. It was included in the reference book "1001 Songs You Must Hear Before You Die."

Content

The song deals with a man asking his partner to go to Lafayette, Louisiana and change her name to something more scandalous, Mrs. Mischievous Comeaux.  The singer is upset they are both far apart and thinks her beauty is far better than her character.

Lyrics

Versions
Several musicians recorded the song. After 1957, Randy and The Rockets released the swamp pop song "Lets Do the Cajun Twist" using the same theme and melody.

In 1990, a version by Dutch band Captain Gumbo reached No. 30 in the official Dutch music singles chart.

References

1928 songs
Cajun folk songs
Columbia Records singles
Songwriter unknown
Okeh Records singles
Grammy Hall of Fame Award recipients
United States National Recording Registry recordings